Henry Dodson (21 April 1828 – 8 May 1892) was a brewer and a 19th-century Member of Parliament from Marlborough, New Zealand.

Biography

Dodson was born in 1828 near Malmesbury in Wiltshire, England. His father, Joseph Dodson, was an officer in the British Army. His mother was Isabella Dodson (née Reid). Joseph Dodson was an older brother.

As a youth, he emigrated to Halifax in Nova Scotia, Canada, to join a brother. Together, they went to Victoria, Australia and joined the Victorian gold rush. After that, he came to Nelson, New Zealand and joined his brother Joseph Dodson in his brewery business. He married Emma Snow (born 6 January 1830) on 10 December 1857 at Nelson. He came to Blenheim in the late 1850s and set up a brewery in that town.

Dodson was a member of the Marlborough Provincial Council for three different electorates from 1860–1863, 1866–1870, and 1874–1875. In the provincial council, he was the head of the Blenheim party for many years, and they quarrelled against the Picton party. He was Mayor of Blenheim for four one-year terms (1870–1871 and 1883–1884). In , he beat the incumbent, Arthur Seymour.

His wife died in June 1883. He died on 8 May 1892 at his home in Blenheim, New Zealand after a sudden illness and was survived by seven children. He was buried at the Omaka Cemetery in his brother George's family plot in the Old Cemetery section.

References

1828 births
1892 deaths
Members of the New Zealand House of Representatives
Mayors of Blenheim, New Zealand
New Zealand MPs for South Island electorates
19th-century New Zealand politicians